José Luis Ponce (born 17 May 1949) is a Cuban diver. He competed in two events at the 1968 Summer Olympics.

References

1949 births
Living people
Cuban male divers
Olympic divers of Cuba
Divers at the 1968 Summer Olympics
20th-century Cuban people